The Elisavetgrad uezd was one of the subdivisions of the Kherson Governorate of the Russian Empire. It was situated in the northern part of the governorate. Its administrative centre was Kropyvnytskyi (Yelisavetgrad).

Demographics
At the time of the Russian Empire Census of 1897, Yelisavetgradsky Uyezd had a population of 613,283. Of these, 66.1% spoke Ukrainian, 15.2% Russian, 9.4% Yiddish, 6.0% Moldovan or Romanian, 1.0% Belarusian, 0.9% German, 0.8% Bulgarian, 0.4% Polish, 0.1% Romani and 0.1% Tatar as their native language.

References

 
Uezds of Kherson Governorate
Kherson Governorate